Richard Regan Kennedy (January 5, 1842 – November 30, 1903) was a member of the Wisconsin State Assembly.

Biography
Kennedy was born in Minersville, Pennsylvania in 1842. He moved to Wisconsin with his parents when he was an infant. During the American Civil War, he was an orderly sergeant with the 27th Wisconsin Volunteer Infantry Regiment of the Union Army. Conflicts he took part include the Siege of Vicksburg. After the war, he was involved in zinc mining. Kennedy died of an abscess of the thigh on November 30, 1903 in Racine, Wisconsin.

Political career
Kennedy was a member of the Assembly during the 1880 and 1883 sessions. Additionally, he was Town Treasurer and Collector of Highland, Iowa County, Wisconsin. He was a Democrat.

References

External links
 

People from Minersville, Pennsylvania
People from Iowa County, Wisconsin
Democratic Party members of the Wisconsin State Assembly
City and town treasurers in the United States
People of Wisconsin in the American Civil War
Union Army soldiers
1842 births
1903 deaths
19th-century American politicians